Mohammad Al-Bakhit (born February 22, 1987) is a male Jordanian Taekwondo practitioner. He won the gold medal in the finweight category (-54 kg) at the 2006 Asian Games.

Career

Mohammad Al Bakhit first gained international attention at the 2002 World Junior Taekwondo Championships where he won the finweight gold medal. On December 7, 2006, he took the gold medal of taekwondo men's finweight (-54 kg), beating Vasavat Somswang from Thailand in the final of the 2006 Asian Games. That was the first gold medal of Jordan in the history of Asian Games.

External links
 Profile and information from The-Sports.org
 Mohammad Al-Bakhit fan page from Facebook

1987 births
Living people
Jordanian male taekwondo practitioners
Asian Games medalists in taekwondo
Taekwondo practitioners at the 2006 Asian Games
Taekwondo practitioners at the 2010 Asian Games
Asian Games gold medalists for Jordan
Medalists at the 2006 Asian Games
21st-century Jordanian people